Psaltoda pictibasis, commonly known as the black friday, is a species of cicada native to Queensland and northeastern New South Wales in eastern Australia.

References

External links

Psaltodini
Hemiptera of Australia
Insects described in 1858